Manuela Tejedor Clemente (stage name, Preciosilla; 7 June
1893 in Calatayud – 12 November 1952 in Madrid) was a Spanish cupletista.

References

External links
La Preciosilla at Gran Enciclopedia Aragonesa 
La Preciosilla at ABC 

1893 births
1952 deaths
People from Calatayud
Cupletistas
20th-century Spanish musicians
20th-century Spanish women singers
20th-century Spanish singers